Rank comparison chart of all navies of European states.

Officers (OF 1–10) 

Remark:
NATO STANAG 2116 lists Officer Designates (listed here as OF(D)) of some countries alongside OF-1 ranks.

See also 
Military rank
Comparative navy officer ranks of the Americas
Comparative navy officer ranks of Asia
Ranks and insignia of NATO navies officers

Notes

References 
 STANAG 2116 NATO chart

Military comparisons